Cold Justice is an unscripted true crime series originally broadcast on TNT and currently on Oxygen. The series, produced by Dick Wolf, follows former prosecutor Kelly Siegler and a team of investigators as they re-open unsolved murder cases with the consent of local law enforcement. As of January 2015, the team has helped local agencies secure 21 arrests, 11 criminal indictments, four confessions, three guilty pleas, and three murder convictions.

Despite no official announcement from TNT, in May 2016, former crime scene investigator Yolanda McClary announced on her Facebook account that the series was canceled. She later stated that the production company is shopping the series to other networks. In June 2017, the Oxygen Channel announced that Cold Justice will premiere with new episodes on July 22, 2017. On June 8, 2021, it was announced that the sixth season will premiere on July 10, 2021.

Series overview

Episodes

Season 1 (2013)

Season 2 (2014)

Season 3 (2015)

Season 4 (2017)

Season 5 (2018–20)

Season 6 (2021–22)

Season 7

References

External links

Cold Justice